George Matthias Ouma (born 3 December 1945) is a Ugandan boxer. He competed at the 1968 Summer Olympics and the 1972 Summer Olympics. At the 1972 Summer Olympics, he lost to Imre Tóth in his first fight.

References

External links
 

1945 births
Living people
Ugandan male boxers
Olympic boxers of Uganda
Boxers at the 1968 Summer Olympics
Boxers at the 1972 Summer Olympics
Sportspeople from Kampala
Commonwealth Games medallists in boxing
Commonwealth Games bronze medallists for Uganda
Boxers at the 1966 British Empire and Commonwealth Games
Light-heavyweight boxers
Medallists at the 1966 British Empire and Commonwealth Games